Chandrakant Keni ( – 3 February 2009) was an Indian Konkani language writer and journalist from Goa. He was the editor of Marathi Daily Rashtramath and Konkani Daily Sunaparant. Keni won Sahitya Academy Award for his Konkani book "Ashad Pawali".

References

Journalists from Goa
2009 deaths
1934 births
Recipients of the Sahitya Akademi Award in Konkani
Konkani-language writers
Recipients of the Sahitya Akademi Prize for Translation